Kurumkan Airport is located in Kurumkan in Buryatia, Russian Federation. Re-opened in 2013, services operate to Baikal International Airport.

History 
The Kurumkan Airport was constructed during the Soviet era, as an airport for seasonal beach tourism around Lake Baikal. In 1992 the airport was partially closed, and closed altogether in 2001 due to financial difficulties of the Bural airline. In 2013 the airport was re-opened, when PANH opened the new regular flight to Ulan-Ude.

Airlines and destinations

References

External links
 Entry in AirportGuide

Airports in Buryatia
Airports built in the Soviet Union
Buildings and structures in Ulan-Ude